Songs from the Kitchen Disco is the first greatest hits album by English singer-songwriter Sophie Ellis-Bextor, released on 13 November 2020 by EGBG's, although it was previously announced for 23 October. It features singles from all her studio albums: Read My Lips (2001), Shoot from the Hip (2003), Trip the Light Fantastic (2007), Make a Scene (2011), Wanderlust (2014) and Familia (2016), as well as a number of cover versions of songs by other artists. Songs from the Kitchen Disco serves as the follow up to her previous release, the 2019 orchestral compilation album The Song Diaries.

Background
In 2019 Ellis-Bextor released The Song Diaries, her first compilation album. It consists primarily of orchestral versions of 15 of her solo singles, and a new track, a cover of Carol Williams's "Love Is You". The album was produced by Ed Harcourt (who also produced her two last studio albums), with additional production by Richard "Biff" Stannard and Ash Howes. During that same year she also embarked on The Song Diaries Tour within the UK with a full orchestra and her band; the tour consisted on 14 dates, grouped in two legs, one in late spring and the other one in autumn.

During the COVID-19 pandemic lockdown, Ellis-Bextor, her husband, The Feeling bassist Richard Jones and their kids hosted a number of live shows via Instagram called Kitchen Disco Live every Friday night for 10 weeks. During these shows, she performed some of her songs (including non-single tracks), and a bunch of covers.

Kitchen Disco shows
Every Friday, for 10 weeks (from 27 March to 29 May), Ellis-Bextor performed a series of live shows via Instagram on her own house as a way of virtual escapism of the hard time she and her family were facing during the COVID-19 pandemic lockdown in the UK. During these shows (named Kitchen Discos) she sang live, while her sons joined her, on the chaotic yet enjoyable performances. Additional shows were hosted on 17 July (celebrating the end of the term) and on 30 October (for Halloween). Ellis-Bextor also did a Christmas special and a further series of shows for the early 2021 lockdown.

The live transmissions lasted 30 minutes, and regular songs included her top-three singles "Take Me Home", "Groovejet (If This Ain't Love)" and "Murder on the Dancefloor". She also performed several of her singles and album tracks and a wide variety of covers. From the Kitchen Disco #6 onwards she did an encore session, called "The After Party", just after the end of the transmissions. During these after parties she sang songs less danceable and more relatable to musicals, like "My Favourite Things" (from The Sound of Music) and "There Are Worse Things I Could Do" (from Grease).

Ellis-Bextor began presenting a weekly programme under the same name (Sophie Ellis-Bextor's Kitchen Disco) on BBC Radio 2 in May 2020.

Critical reception

Songs from the Kitchen Disco received positive reviews from music critics and fans alike, many of whom associated the album with the Instagram Live shows held by Ellis-Bextor during the pandemic lockdown, emphasising her 20 years of solo career and the fine selection of singles and covers included.

Lauren Murphy from The Irish Times wrote "if the mark of a great song is that it works in any setting – be it a kitchen surrounded by small children hanging off your leg or on the dance floor of an actual club in the wee hours – this collection is evidence that the perennially-underestimated Ellis-Bextor has amassed more than a few of them over the last two decades" Nick Smith from musicOMH called the collection "magnificent".

Additionally, Clashs Robin Murray states: "Sophie Ellis-Bextor has shone fresh light on her inimitable pop approach, recasting these songs in her own manner. Songs from the Kitchen Disco is the ideal tonic for those winter blues."

Track listing

Charts

Release history

References

2020 compilation albums
Sophie Ellis-Bextor albums